Li Yuqiang (born 10 September 1965) is a Chinese retired para table tennis player. She is a member of the Li ethnic group on Hainan island. She won a gold and a bronze medal at the 2004 Paralympic Games.

Her left arm was amputated when she was two years old, following a car accident. Although she played the sport when she was young, she did not receive formal training until age 31.

References

1965 births
Living people
Paralympic table tennis players of China
Chinese female table tennis players
Table tennis players at the 2008 Summer Paralympics
Table tennis players at the 2004 Summer Paralympics
Medalists at the 2004 Summer Paralympics
People from Ledong Li Autonomous County
Paralympic gold medalists for China
Paralympic bronze medalists for China
Paralympic medalists in table tennis
Table tennis players from Hainan
Chinese amputees
Li people
FESPIC Games competitors